The 1953 All England Championships was a badminton tournament held at the Empress Hall, Earls Court, London, England, from 19–22 March 1953.

Final results

Results

Men's singles

Women's singles

References

All England Open Badminton Championships
All England Badminton Championships
All England Open Badminton Championships in London
All England Badminton Championships
All England Badminton Championships
All England Badminton Championships